Albert may refer to:

Companies
 Albert Czech Republic, a supermarket chain in the Czech Republic
 Albert Heijn, a supermarket chain in the Netherlands
 Albert Market, a street market in The Gambia
 Albert Productions, a record label
 Albert Computers, Inc., a computer manufacturer in the 1980s

Entertainment
 Albert (1985 film), a Czechoslovak film directed by František Vláčil
 Albert (2015 film), a film by Karsten Kiilerich
 Albert (2016 film), an American TV movie
 Albert (album), by Ed Hall, 1988
 "Albert" (short story), by Leo Tolstoy
 Albert (comics), a character in Marvel Comics
 Albert (Discworld), a character in Terry Pratchett's Discworld series
 Albert, a character in Dario Argento's 1977 film Suspiria

Military
 Battle of Albert (1914), a WWI battle at Albert, Somme, France
 Battle of Albert (1916), a WWI battle at Albert, Somme, France
 Battle of Albert (1918), a WWI battle at Albert, Somme, France

People
 Albert (given name)
 Albert (surname)
 Albert (wrestler) (born 1972), stage name of professional wrestler Matt Bloom
 Albert (dancer) (François-Ferdinand 1789–1865), French ballet dancer

Places

Canada
 Albert (1846–1973 electoral district), a provincial electoral district in New Brunswick from 1846 to 1973
 Albert (electoral district), a federal electoral district in New Brunswick from 1867 to 1903
 Albert (provincial electoral district), a provincial electoral district in New Brunswick
 Albert County, New Brunswick
 Rural Municipality of Albert, Manitoba, Canada

United States
 Albert, Kansas
 Albert Township, Michigan
 Albert, Oklahoma
 Albert, Texas, a ghost town
 The Albert (Detroit), formerly the Griswold Building, an American apartment block

Elsewhere
 Albert (Belize House constituency), a Belize City-based electoral constituency
 Albert, New South Wales, a town in Australia
 Electoral district of Albert, a former electoral district in Queensland, Australia
 Albert, Somme, a French commune

Transportation
 Albert (automobile), a 1920s British light car
 Albert (motorcycle), a 1920s German vehicle brand
 Albert (tugboat), a 1979 U.S. tugboat

Other
 719 Albert, Amor asteroid
 Albert (crater), a lunar crater
 The Albert, a pub in London

See also 
 
 Alberta (disambiguation)
 Alberts (disambiguation)
 Alberte (born 1963), a Danish singer and actress
 Albertet, a diminutive of Albert
 Albret, a seigneurie in Landes, France
 Aubert, an Anglo-Saxon surname